The 2007 New York City Marathon was the 38th running of the annual marathon race in New York City, United States, which took place on Sunday, November 4. The men's elite race was won by Kenya's Martin Lel in a time of 2:09:04 hours while the women's race was won by Great Britain's Paula Radcliffe in 2:23:09.

In the wheelchair races, Australia's Kurt Fearnley (1:33:58) and Switzerland's Edith Hunkeler (1:52:38) won the men's and women's divisions, respectively. In the handcycle race, Americans Alejandro Albor (1:17:48) and Helene Hines (1:57:18) were the winners.

A total of 38,557 runners finished the race, 26,042 men and 12,515 women.

Results

Men

Women

Wheelchair men

Wheelchair women

Handcycle men

Handcycle women

References

Results
2007 New York Marathon Results. New York Road Runners. Retrieved 2020-05-17.
Men's results. Association of Road Racing Statisticians. Retrieved 2020-04-12.
Women's results. Association of Road Racing Statisticians. Retrieved 2020-04-12.

External links

New York Road Runners website

2007
New York City
Marathon
New York City Marathon